Novomyrhorod is a city in Novoukrainka Raion, Kirovohrad Oblast (region) of central Ukraine, in the southern part of the Middle Dnieper area. It hosts the administration of Novomyrhorod urban hromada, one of the hromadas of Ukraine.

Novomyrhorod is situated on the banks of the Velyka Vys River.

Name and history

The name literally means "New Myrhorod" or "new peace town".

Between 1752 and 1764, Novomyrhorod was the capital of New Serbia, a military frontier established by the Russian Empire that had an ethnic Serbian majority.

Since 1802 it was a town in Kherson Governorate of Russian Empire.

Since 1923 Novomyrhorod was the district center of Yelysavethradsky District, Ukrainian SSR. 

City since 1960.

In 1989 population was 16 349 people.

In 2013 population was 11 569 people.

Until 18 July 2020, Novomyrhorod was the administrative center of Novomyrhorod Raion. The raion was abolished in July 2020 as part of the administrative reform of Ukraine, which reduced the number of raions of Kirovohrad Oblast to four. The area of Novomyrhorod Raion was merged into Novoukrainka Raion.

Notable people
 
 
Stepan Kozhumyaka (1898–1989), Ukrainian engineer, bridge-builder and linguist
Viacheslav Petrov (b. 1994), Ukrainian professional basketball player

Gallery

See also

 Zlatopol — former town, Jewish shtetl, now it is a part of Novomyrhorod.

References

Cities in Kirovohrad Oblast
Cities of district significance in Ukraine
Yelisavetgradsky Uyezd
Slavo-Serbia